This is a list of dormant and extinct volcanoes in Turkey.

See also
Geology of Turkey
Geothermal power in Turkey

References 

Volcanoes
Turkey